= Meinertulidae =

Scientific classification
- Kingdom: Animalia
- Phylum: Arthropoda
- Subphylum: Chelicerata
- Class: Arachnida
- Order: Mesostigmata
- Family: Meinertulidae; Trägårdh, 1950

Family of mites

Meinertulidae is a family of mites in the order Mesostigmata.

== Species ==
Meinertulidae contains one genus, with one recognized species:

- Genus Meinertula Trägårdh, 1950
  - Meinertula hamifera Trägårdh, 1950
